George Anselm Touchet, also spelt Tuchet, (born after 1618 - died 1689 or earlier) was the Roman Catholic chaplain of Queen Catherine of Braganza, the wife of King Charles II from 1671 till his banishment in 1678.

The second son of Mervyn Tuchet, 2nd Earl of Castlehaven, by his marriage to Elizabeth Barnham, and a younger brother of James Tuchet, 3rd Earl of Castlehaven, Touchet began life as George Tuchet in Stalbridge, Dorset. In 1631, his father was convicted and executed for various sexual crimes, including rape and sodomy. In 1643 Touchet became a Benedictine monk at St Gregory's, Douai, and was clothed a monk under the name of Anselm. After the Restoration of the Stuarts he was made chaplain to Queen Catherine, with an apartment at St James's Palace and subsequently another at Somerset House, and with an allowance of £100 a year.

Touchet's Historical collections, a work of Catholic controversy, appeared in 1674, and he was banished from England the following year. In 1682 he was debarred by an Act of Parliament from succeeding to his brother's earldom and estates. An abridged version of his manuscript translation of a devotional work by the French mystic Constantine Barbanson (1581–1632) was published in 1928 as The Secret Paths of Divine Love.

Works
Historical collections out of several grave Protestant historians concerning the changes of religion and the strange confusions following from thence, 1674. Reissued 'with an Addition' in 1686.
The Secret Paths of Divine Love, 1928. Tr. from French of Constantine Barbanson, abridged by a nun of Stanbrook Abbey, ed. with introduction by Dom Justin McCann

References

1600s births
1680s deaths
English Benedictines
17th-century English Roman Catholic priests
History of Catholicism in England
People from Stalbridge
Younger sons of earls
Household of Catherine of Braganza